Isabelle Candelier (born 12 June 1963) is a French film and television actress.

Filmography

References

External links
 

1963 births
Living people
French film actresses
French television actresses
21st-century French actresses
20th-century French actresses
French stage actresses
People from Albi